Operation Autumn is a 2012 film directed by Bruno de Almeida and starring John Ventimiglia and Carlos Santos. A political thriller about the operation that lead to the brutal assassination of General Humberto Delgado, killed by the Portuguese police in 1965, during the Estado Novo regime. It was released on 22 November 2012.

Cast

Accolades

References

External links

2010s historical thriller films
Thriller films based on actual events
Films produced by Paulo Branco
Portuguese historical films
Portuguese thriller films
Films directed by Bruno de Almeida